Schönebeck was a district (Kreis) in the middle of Saxony-Anhalt, Germany. Neighboring districts are (from north clockwise) the district-free city Magdeburg, the districts Jerichower Land, Anhalt-Zerbst, Köthen, Bernburg, Aschersleben-Staßfurt and Bördekreis.

History 
The district was created on July 1, 1816, with the capital Calbe, and was therefore named Landkreis Calbe. 1946 Schönebeck became a district-free city, but was reincorporated into the district in 1950 and became the new administrative seat. It was also renamed to Landkreis Schönebeck then to represent the change of capital.

Geography 
Main rivers in the district are the Elbe and the Saale. The landscape is the mostly flat Magdeburger Börde. The elevation of the district ranges between 43 m and 123 m above sea level.

Partnerships
In 1991 the district started a friendship with the Polish district Jarosław, which was converted into a partnership in 2001. Another friendship with the district Wittmund in Lower Saxony.

Coat of arms

Towns and municipalities

External links 
  (German)